Huron Herbert Smith (26 July 1883 – 25 February 1933) was an American botanist and ethnobotanist. Born in Danville, Indiana, he studied and wrote about the use of plants by several tribes of Native Americans. He was an alumnus of Depauw University and Cornell University, and after receiving his degrees, became the assistant curator of botany at the Field Museum of Natural History followed then by becoming the head of the botany department at the Milwaukee Public Museum. Smith's botanical specimen collection is stored at the Milwaukee Public Museum, digitized and available for viewing online. Smith died in 1933 as the result of an automobile accident.

References

1883 births
1933 deaths
American botanists
20th-century American botanists
DePauw University alumni
Cornell University alumni